Platycyamus may refer to:
Platycyamus (plant), a genus of plants in the family Fabaceae
Platycyamus (amphipod), a genus of whale lice in the family Cyamidae